Life After Cash Money is the seventh studio album by American rapper B.G. It was released on July 27, 2004 on Chopper City Records and Koch Records. The album has production from DJ Smurf, Sinista, Dani Kartel, Da Architeks, K.I.D.D., KLC, and more. The album features the singles "My World I Want It & "Hold That Thought". There are guest appearances from the Chopper City Boyz, T.I. and Ying Yang Twins.

Track listing

References

2004 albums
B.G. (rapper) albums